Madhu Malathi is a 1966 Indian Kannada-language film, directed by S. K. A. Chari and produced by M. Sampath. The film stars Rajkumar, Udaykumar, Arun Kumar and Bharathi Vishnuvardhan. The film has musical score by G. K. Venkatesh. The story of the movie is based on one of the popular Vikram - Betal story from Betala Panchavimashti, an 11th-century Sanskrit work whose earliest recensions are found in Kathasaritsagara written by Somadeva. However, the title card credited the story to director himself with  a note that it was based on a book by Bhavabhuti. The movie was dubbed in Tamil as Vedhalan Sonna Kathai. The movie has the characteristics of swashbuckler films with the three male lead roles playing swashbucklers and the sole female lead playing a damsel in distress.

Cast

Rajkumar as Trivikramasena
Udaykumar
Arun Kumar
Bharathi Vishnuvardhan as Madhu Malathi
K. S. Ashwath as Keshava Chandragupta
M. P. Shankar
Kuppuraj
Ranga
M. Jayashree
B. R. Hema
R. Nagendra Rao in Guest Appearance
Girimaji
Anantharam Maccheri
Keshavamurthy
Lakshmayya
Narayan
Shyamsundar
Honnappa
Stunt Rathnam

References

External links
 
 

1966 films
1960s Kannada-language films
Films scored by G. K. Venkatesh